Sayyid Muhammad al-Mahdi al-Mauood Jaunpuri (9 September 1443 – 23 April 1505) was a Muslim mystic and self-proclaimed Mahdi who founded the breakaway Mahdavia sect. Hailing from Jaunpur, Uttar Pradesh, Jaunpuri traveled extensively throughout India, Arabia and Khorasan.

Early life

His first wife, Bibi Alahdadi, was the daughter of his uncle, Syed Jalaluddin. He Married her in Jaunpur in 866H, when he was nineteen years old. Jaunpuri and Alhadadi had two sons and two daughters together, Syed Mahmood Sani-e-Mahdi, Syed Ajmal, Syeda Khunza and Syeda Fatima.

Travels
He left Jaunpur along with his family and a group of followers. Migrating from place to place and gathering companions, that would later become the core of the Mahdavia sect founded by him, until he reached Farah in Afghanistan .

Pilgrimage and claim to be the Mahdi
By the age of 53 he embarked on the Hajj pilgrimage to Mecca, where in 1496 (901 Hijri), after circumambulating the Kaaba, he declared that he was the Promised Mahdi and whoever believes in him is a Momin.

He was generally ignored by the ulema of Mecca, and after staying in Mecca for nearly seven or nine months, he returned to India where he proclaimed himself Mahdi at Ahmedabad and later at Badhli (near Patan, Gujarat).

References

1443 births
1505 deaths
Mahdavi
Indian Sufi saints
Indian people of Arab descent
People from Jaunpur, Uttar Pradesh